Dancing with the Stars  returned for a fifth series on 9 January 2022 on RTÉ One. This was the first series in two years after the show was put on a year-long hiatus during the COVID-19 pandemic.

On 12 November 2021, it was announced that the show would return in the New Year with Nicky Byrne and Jennifer Zamparelli returning as hosts for a fifth and third series, respectively. It was also confirmed that Brian Redmond and Loraine Barry return as judges, however, Julian Benson did not. Armenian-born choreographer and creative director, Arthur Gourounlian joined the judging panel in Benson's place. It was also confirmed that the series would start with twelve celebrities, rather than eleven as it had been for the previous four installments.

This series also saw professional dancers, Giulia Dotta, Kai Widdrington, Robert Rowiński and Ryan McShane depart the show. They were replaced by five new professional dancers, Denys Samson, Ervinas Merfeldas, Hannah Kelly, Maurizio Benenato and Salome Chachua.

The final on 27 March 2022, was won by Nina Carberry and her partner Pasquale La Rocca. This marks La Rocca's second consecutive win, thereby making him the only professional dancer with more than one win on the show.

This was Nicky Byrne's final series as host.

Couples
On 10 December 2021, during an episode of The Late Late Show, Aengus Mac Grianna, Ellen Keane, Gráinne Seoige and Neil Delamere were announced as the first celebrities to be taking part. The remaining celebrities were announced throughout the following week.

Scoring chart 

 Red numbers indicate the couples with the lowest score for each week.
 Green numbers indicate the couples with the highest score for each week.
  the couple eliminated that week
  the returning couple that was called forward and eventually last to be called safe, but was not necessarily in the bottom
  the returning couple that finished in the bottom two and competed in the Dance-Off
  the winning couple
  the two/three runners-up 
  the couple was immune from elimination
 "—" indicates the couple(s) did not dance that week

Average chart 
This table only counts for dances scored on a traditional 30-points scale. It does not include the Team Dance or Marathon scores.

Highest and lowest scoring performances 
The highest and lowest performances in each dance according to the judges' scale are as follows.

Couples' highest and lowest scoring dances

Weekly scores and songs 
Unless indicated otherwise, individual judges scores in the charts below (given in parentheses) are listed in this order from left to right: Brian Redmond, Loraine Barry, Arthur Gourounlian.

Week 1
Guest act: Series 4 champions, Lottie Ryan and Pasquale La Rocca performed a Salsa to the theme from “Dora the Explorer”

 Running order

Week 2
Guest act: Wild Youth performing 'Through the Phone'.

 Running order

Week 3

Host, Jennifer Zamparelli, was absent from this show due to testing positive for COVID-19. Series 4 champion, Lottie Ryan, co-hosted the show with Nicky Byrne in her place.

Running order

Week 4: Movie Week
Guest act: Irish National Youth Ballet performing a piece from Cinderella. 
  Running order

Week 5
  Running order

Week 6: Dedicated Dance Week
  Running order
There was no elimination in Week 6. The judges still scored and the public still voted. However, in a twist, the couple who received the highest combined points was immune from the following week's first Dance-Off, therefore securing their place in the competition until Week 8. The couple granted immunity was Matthew and Laura.

Due to testing positive for COVID-19, Missy Keating was unable to perform. She was due to perform a Viennese Waltz dedicated to her deceased grandmother, Marie Keating. Under the rules of the show, Missy and her partner, Ervinas Merfeldas, were given a bye to the following week.

Week 7
  Running order

Dance-Off

Judges' Votes to Save

 Gourounlian: Erica & Denys
 Redmond: Erica & Denys
 Barry: Did not vote, but would have voted to save Erica & Denys

Week 8: Big Band Week
All performances this week were accompanied by the RTÉ Concert Orchestra.
Running order

Due to testing positive for COVID-19, Nicolas Roche was unable to perform. Under the rules of the show, Nicolas and his partner, Karen Byrne, were given a bye to the following week.

Dance-Off

Judges' Votes to Save

 Gourounlian: Jordan & Salome
 Redmond: Jordan & Salome
 Barry: Did not vote, but would have voted to save Jordan & Salome

Week 9

Running order

*Due to testing positive for COVID-19, Denys Samson was unable to perform with his partner, Erica-Cody. She was partnered with Ervinas Merfeldas for this week.

Dance-Off

Judges' Votes to Save

 Gourounlian: Jordan & Salome
 Redmond: Jordan & Salome
 Barry: Did not vote, but would have voted to save Jordan & Salome

Week 10: Around the World Week

Running order

*Due to testing positive for COVID-19, Salome Chachua and Stephen Vincent were unable to perform with their partners, Jordan Conroy and Ellen Keane. Emily Barker and Ervinas Merfeldas stood in for them, respectively.

Dance-Off

Judges' Votes to Save

 Gourounlian: Ellen & Ervinas
 Redmond: Ellen & Ervinas
 Barry: Did not vote, but would have voted to save Ellen & Ervinas

Week 11: Semifinal

Running order

Dance-Off

Judges' Votes to Save

 Gourounlian: Erica & Denys
 Redmond: Erica & Denys
 Barry: Did not vote, but would have voted to save Erica & Denys

Week 12: The Final
Guest act: Becky Hill performing 'Run'. 
Running order

Dance chart 
  Highest scoring dance
  Lowest scoring dance
  No dance performed
  Not performed due to illness or injury
  Immune from elimination

References

External links 

 Official website

Season 05